The Electravia GMPE 205 is a French electric motor for powering electric aircraft, designed and produced by Electravia of Vaumeilh.

By April 2018, the engine was no longer advertised on the company website and seems to be out of production.

Design and development
The GMPE 205 is a brushed 111 volt design producing , with a disk collector. It has a 93% efficiency and uses a poly V-belt reduction drive.

Specifications (GMPE 205)

See also

References

Aircraft electric engines